Miss America 1965, the 38th Miss America pageant, was held at the Boardwalk Hall in Atlantic City, New Jersey on September 12, 1964 on CBS Network.

Pageant winner Vonda Kay Van Dyke authored books in years to come. She was the first Miss America to use ventriloquism in the talent portion of the contest. Miss Arkansas, first runner-up Karen Carlson, later became an actress, seen in several films and many television series.

Results

Order of announcements

Top 10

Top 5

Awards

Preliminary awards

Other awards

Contestants

References

External links
 Miss America official website

1965
1964 in the United States
1965 beauty pageants
1964 in New Jersey
September 1964 events in the United States
Events in Atlantic City, New Jersey